Evraim Toncy Awes (born 13 November 1997) is an Indonesian professional footballer who plays as a defender.

Club career

Persipura Jayapura
He was signed for Persipura Jayapura to play in Liga 1 in the 2018 season. Awes made his league debut on 3 November 2019 in a match against Madura United at the Gelora Bangkalan Stadium, Bangkalan.

Career statistics

Club

References

External links
 Evraim Awes at Soccerway
 Evraim Awes at Liga Indonesia

1997 births
Living people
Indonesian footballers
Persipura Jayapura players
Persewangi Banyuwangi players
Liga 1 (Indonesia) players
People from Sarmi Regency
Association football defenders
Sportspeople from Papua